Archer is an unincorporated community in Madison County, in the U.S. state of Idaho.

History
A post office called Archer was established in 1902, and remained in operation until 1920. The community was named after the maiden name of Zilpha A. Young.

Archer's population was 250 in 1909, and 50 in 1960.

References

Unincorporated communities in Madison County, Idaho
Unincorporated communities in Idaho